Pierre-Olivier Gourinchas is a French economist who currently works as S.K. and Angela Chan Professor of Management at the University of California, Berkeley, where he also directs the Clausen Center for International Business and Policy and is affiliated with the Haas School of Business. His research focuses on macroeconomics, in particular international macroeconomics and international finance. In 2008, Gourinchas received the Prize of the Best Young Economist of France.

Effective January 24, 2022, he was appointed the Chief Economist of the International Monetary Fund (IMF), succeeding Gita Gopinath. As Chief Economist, he is part of the Senior Leadership of the IMF.

Biography

Pierre-Olivier Gourinchas studied at the École Polytechnique (1987–90), École des Ponts et Chaussées (1990-93), and Massachusetts Institute of Technology (1993–96), obtaining a Ph.D. from the last with a thesis on exchange rates and consumption under Olivier Blanchard, Ricardo Caballero and Rudiger Dornbusch. Since his graduation, Gourinchas has held academic positions at the Stanford Graduate School of Business, Princeton University, and - since 2003 - at the University of California, Berkeley, where he has been the Director of the Clausen Center for International Business and Policy since 2013. Moreover, Gourinchas is also editor-in-chief of the IMF Economic Review, managing editor of the Journal of International Economics and co-director of the NBER International Finance and Macroeconomics programme. He is a fellow of the Econometric Society.

Research

Pierre-Olivier Gourinchas' research interests include consumption, precautionary savings, credit expansions, the forward premium anomaly, exchange rates and labour markets. According to IDEAS/RePEc, Gourinchas belongs to the top 2% of economists as ranked by research output.

Key publications

 Gourinchas, P.O., Parker, J.A. (2002). Consumption over the life cycle. Econometrica, 70(1), pp. 47–89.
 Gourinchas, P.O., Farhi, E., Caballero, R.J. (2008). An Equilibrium Model of "Global Imbalances" and Low Interest Rates. American Economic Review, 98, pp. 358–393.
 Gourinchas, P.O., Rey, H. (2007). From world banker to world venture capitalist: US external adjustment and the exorbitant privilege. In: Clarida, R.H. (ed.). G7 Current Account Imbalances. Chicago: University of Chicago Press, pp. 11–66.
 Gourinchas, P.O., Rey, H. (2005). International financial adjustment. NBER Working Paper Series.
 Gourinchas, P.O., Jeanne, O. (2006). The elusive gains from international financial integration. Review of Economic Studies, 73(3), pp. 715–741.
 Gourinchas, P.O., Obstfeld, M. (2012). Stories of the twentieth century for the twenty-first. American Economic Journal: Macroeconomics, 4(1), pp. 226–265.
 Gourinchas, P.O., Valdes, R., Landerretche, O. (2001). Lending booms: Latin America and the world. NBER Working Paper Series.
 Gourinchas, P.O., Jeanne, O. (2007). Capital flows to developing countries: The allocation puzzle. NBER Working Paper Series.
 Gourinchas, P.O., Rey, H. (2014). External adjustment, global imbalances, valuation effects. In: Handbook of International Economics, vol. 4. Amsterdam: Elsevier, pp. 585–645.
 Gourinchas, P.O., Tornell, A. (2004). Exchange rate puzzles and distorted beliefs. Journal of International Economics, 64(2), pp. 303–333.
 Li, N. et al. (2010). International prices, costs, and markup differences. American Economic Review.

References

External links
 Homepage of Pierre-Olivier Gourinchas
 Google Scholar profile of Pierre-Olivier Gourinchas

21st-century  French  economists
École Polytechnique alumni
Fellows of the Econometric Society
French economists
Haas School of Business faculty
International economists
International Monetary Fund people
Living people
Macroeconomists
Year of birth missing (living people)